Tredje Natur (literally "Third Nature") is a Copenhagen-based architectural firm specializing in urban design and planning. It was founded by Flemming Rafn Thomsen and Ole Schrøder in 2012. Malene Krüger joined the firm in January 2015.

Selected works
 St. Kjeld's Quarter, Copenhagen, Denmark (completion win 2012)
 Vinge masterplan, Frederikssund, Denmark (competition win, October 2014)
 Enghaveparken, Copenhagen, Denmark (competition win, January 2015)
 South Camp redevelopment, Værløse Air Base (with COBE Architects), Værløse, Denmark (competition win, January 2015)
 Faste Batteri (with Arkitema), Copenhagen, Denmark (competition win, March 2015)
 Sølund (with C. F. Møller Architects), Copenhagen, Denmark (competition win, March 2016)

References

External links
 Official website
 Third nature: Flemming Rafn Thomsen at TEDxCopenhagenSalon
 Danish Architecture Centre description of St Kjelds Quarter project

Companies based in Copenhagen Municipality
Architecture firms based in Copenhagen
Danish companies established in 2012